Koko: A Red Dog Story is a 2019 Australian family documentary film directed by Aaron McCann and Dominic Pearce, written by Aaron McCann and Dominic Pearce, and starring Jason Isaacs, Felix Williamson and Sarah Woods. It is a spin-off to the 2011 film Red Dog, detailing the life of Koko, who was cast as Red Dog in the original film.

Cast
 Jason Isaacs as narrator
 Felix Williamson as Nelson Woss
 Sarah Woods as Carol Hobday
 Toby Truslove as Kriv Stenders
 Kriv Stenders as himself
 Carol Hobday as herself
 Koko was portrayed by Hero (Koko passed away 2012) 
 Nelson Woss as himself

Production
Filming began in 2018 in Perth, Western Australia.

Reception
Koko: A Red Dog Story received mostly positive reviews from critics.

Andrew Peirce at The Curb called the film "a genuine dogsterpiece of a film". Out in Perth writer, Leigh Andrew Hill, referred to the film as "a heart-warming celebration of all dogs". While Jonathan Spiroff of The Mono Report, referred to the film as "a charming, crowd-pleasing documentary that is essential for dog-lovers".

Conversely, Luke Buckmaster at The Guardian said "What should be a delightful romp about a famous dog blends fact and fiction so thoroughly it may end up breaking your brain."

See also
Red Dog: True Blue, a 2016 prequel to Red Dog.

References

External links
 Koko: A Red Dog Story at Screenwest
 Koko: A Red Dog Story at Internet Movie Database
 Koko: A Red Dog Story at Rotten Tomatoes

2019 films
Australian comedy-drama films
Films about dogs
Australian films based on actual events
Films set in the 2000s
Films set in Western Australia
Films produced by Nelson Woss
Films scored by Cezary Skubiszewski
Films set in the 21st century
2010s English-language films
Screen Australia films
Roadshow Entertainment films